Extremely Severe Cyclonic Storm Fani was the worst tropical cyclone to strike the Indian state of Odisha since the 1999 Odisha cyclone. The second named storm and the first severe cyclonic storm of the 2019 North Indian Ocean cyclone season, Fani originated from a tropical depression that formed west of Sumatra in the Indian Ocean on 26 April. Vertical wind shear at first hindered the storm's development, but conditions became more favorable for Fani on 30 April. Fani rapidly intensified into an extremely severe cyclonic storm and reached its peak intensity on 2 May, with 1-minute sustained winds equivalent to a Category 5 major hurricane. Fani slightly weakened before making its landfall, and its convective structure rapidly degraded thereafter, degenerating into a remnant low on 4 May, and dissipating on the next day. It was succeeded by Cyclone Amphan in 2020 which caused a greater overall damage.

Prior to Fani's landfall, authorities in India and Bangladesh moved at least a million people each from areas within Fani's projected path onto higher ground, and into cyclone shelters, which is thought to have reduced the resultant death toll and casualties. Fani killed at least 89 people in eastern India and Bangladesh and caused about US$8.1 billion in damages in both India and Bangladesh, mostly in Odisha, in India.

Meteorological history

The IMD began tracking a depression located to the west of Sumatra on 26 April, classifying it as BOB 02. Later that day, the Joint Typhoon Warning Center (JTWC) issued a Tropical Cyclone Formation Alert on the system. Afterward, the storm slowly coalesced while moving northward, and was upgraded to a deep depression at 00:00 UTC on 27 April. At the same time, the JTWC began warning on the system, designating it 01B. Six hours later, the IMD upgraded the system to a cyclonic storm and gave it the name Fani.

The system continued to intensify until 18:00 UTC on 27 April, after which it stagnated for over a day, as convection around the storm's center waxed and waned. Fani resumed strengthening around 12:00 UTC, with the IMD upgrading it to a severe cyclonic storm. As a result, the JTWC upgraded Fani to a Category 1-equivalent cyclone late on 29 April. Around 00:00 UTC on 30 April, Fani was upgraded to a very severe cyclonic storm by the IMD. The organization of the system continued to improve, with tight spiral banding wrapping into a formative eye feature, resulting in Fani being upgraded to an extremely severe cyclonic storm by the IMD around 12:00 UTC while the JTWC upgraded the storm to a Category 3-equivalent cyclone hours later. Development proceeded more slowly over the following days, with little improvement evident in the system's satellite presentation. On 2 May, however, the central dense overcast became more symmetrical and the eye more distinct, and Fani was upgraded to a Category 4-equivalent cyclone by the JTWC at 06:00 UTC.

Fani quickly weakened after peak intensity. At 8:00 a.m. This made Fani the most intense storm to make landfall in India's Odisha state since the 1999 Odisha cyclone. Land interaction quickly degraded Fani's convective structure; and it weakened to a Category 1-equivalent tropical cyclone soon after landfall. Fani continued to weaken after landfall, weakening to a cyclonic storm later that day, before passing just north of Kolkata. On 4 May, Fani weakened to a deep depression and moved into Bangladesh, before degenerating into a well-marked low later on the same day. On 5 May, Fani's remnant low dissipated over Bhutan.

Fani developed during a period of high concentration of anthropogenic aerosols in the Bay of Bengal with abnormally high sea surface temperature (SST), thereby presenting a compound effect of atmospheric aerosols and regional climate warming on a tropical cyclone. Research indicates that aerosol and its interaction with the atmosphere acted to mitigate the strengthening effect of anthropogenic warming on Fani, but was not strong enough to entirely counteract it.

Preparations

The India Meteorological Department tracked the storm and issued numerous yellow warnings for much of the south-eastern portion of India when the cyclone started to intensify. In preparation for the storm's impact, the state government of Odisha and its agency OSDMA evacuated over 1.2 million residents from vulnerable coastal areas and moved them to higher ground and into cyclone shelters built a few kilometres inland. The authorities deployed around a thousand emergency workers and 43,000 volunteers in these efforts. It sent out 2.6 million text messages to warn of the storm in addition to using television, sirens and public-address systems to communicate the message. About 7,000 kitchens were operated to feed evacuees in 9,000 storm shelters.

The Indian Navy readied naval ships and aircraft at Arakkonam and Visakhapatnam air-bases to prepare for the storm's aftermath and aid in reconnaissance, rescue and relief operations. The Odisha government staged "300 power boats, two helicopters and many chain saws, to cut downed trees" for the purpose.
 
Authorities in Bangladesh were ordered to open shelter areas as well in 19 coastal districts. Bangladesh Navy deployed 32 naval ships to provide emergency relief and medical assistance to the coastal areas in case of any emergencies. More than 1.2 million people were evacuated in Bangladesh and moved to the cyclone shelters in coastal areas.

Impact and aftermath

Odisha 
Approximately 72 people have been killed by Fani in India; 64 in Odisha, In Odisha, a teenager of 14 years was killed after being hit by a falling tree. One woman died when she was hit by flying debris, and another died of a heart attack while in a cyclone shelter. The cyclone adversely affected electricity supply and telecommunication in several coastal areas of Odisha, and to a lesser extent, of West Bengal. Puri and Khordha district in Odisha were the worst hit. The Jagannath Temple in Puri suffered minor damage, the repairing cost were estimated to be ₹51 million (US$738,000). The KIIT University also suffered a damage of about ₹300 million (US$4.3 million). Total damage in Odisha were estimated at ₹120 billion (US$1.74 billion), mostly in property damage and the relief. After the cyclone, Odisha required ₹170 billion (US$2.46 billion) for rebuilding the infrastructure. Indian Prime Minister Narendra Modi announced that the government had released over ₹10 billion (US$145 million) for the states affected by Fani. There were massive environmental devastation, as well.

Andhra Pradesh
Although no fatalities occurred in Andhra Pradesh, Srikakulam and Vizianagaram districts reported an economic loss of ₹586.2 million (US$8.5 million). The South Central Railway also suffered a damage of about ₹29.8 million (US$432,000).

Bangladesh
Fani killed 17 people in ten districts of Bangladesh. In Bagerhat District, a woman died after being hit by a falling tree, and 7 of them were killed by lightning in two districts of Bangladesh. Total damage in Bangladesh were up to ৳5.37 billion (US$63.6 million).

The Bangladeshi government distributed rice, dried food, and ৳19.7 million (US$234,000) to those affected by the cyclone Fani.

See also

 1999 Odisha cyclone – The strongest cyclone on record to strike Odisha; also the most intense storm recorded in the North Indian Ocean, which killed over 10,000 people
 Cyclone Viyaru – Took a similar path and affected Bangladesh and Myanmar in 2013
 Cyclone Phailin – A powerful tropical cyclone that struck Odisha in 2013, which displaced over 1 million people
 Cyclone Matmo–Bulbul
 Cyclone Amphan – A powerful Super Cyclonic Storm that affected similar areas in 2020
 List of near-Equatorial tropical cyclones

Notes

References

External links

 India Meteorological Department
 01B.FANI from the U.S. Naval Research Laboratory
 

Extremely severe cyclonic storms
Tropical cyclones in 2019
2019 North Indian Ocean cyclone season
2019 disasters in India
April 2019 events in Asia
2019 disasters in Bangladesh
April 2019 events in India